Brevibora is a genus of cyprinid freshwater fish native to Southeast Asia.

Species
There are currently 3 recognized species in this genus:

 Brevibora cheeya T. Y. Liao & H. H. Tan, 2011
 Brevibora exilis T. Y. Liao & H. H. Tan, 2014
 Brevibora dorsiocellata Duncker, 1904 (Eyespot rasbora)

References

 
Fish of Asia
Taxa named by Sven O. Kullander
Freshwater fish genera